According to the Book of Mormon, Lehi was a prophet who lived in Jerusalem during the reign of king Zedekiah (approximately 600 BC). Lehi was an Israelite of the Tribe of Joseph, and father to Nephi, another prominent prophet in the Book of Mormon. In the first book of the Book of Mormon, First Nephi, Lehi and Nephi lead their family out of Jerusalem, and across the sea to the "promised land" (the Americas). He is also the namesake of the modern-day city of Lehi, Utah.

Life according to the Book of Mormon

According to the Book of Mormon, the families of Lehi, his friend Ishmael and another man named Zoram left Jerusalem some time before its destruction by the Babylonians in approximately 587 BC. Lehi's group proceeded southward down the Arabian Peninsula until they reached a location called Nahom.  For some time, Lehi dwelt in a tent.   Ishmael is reported to have died by this time, and he was buried at this location.

From Nahom, the group proceeded in an eastward direction across the desert until they reached a fertile coastal region they named Bountiful, where Lehi's son Nephi was instructed by the Lord to build a ship for the purpose of sailing across the ocean to the "promised land." The party of men, women and children along with their animals boarded the ship and sailed until they reached the Americas.

The Book of Mormon relates that during his family's journey to the Americas and before his death, Lehi gave important teachings to his children and their posterity that were recorded by Nephi on metallic plates that were later used in compiling the Book of Mormon.

Family
Upon Lehi's death, his sons Nephi and Laman established two conflicting nations, the Nephites and the Lamanites, and as such he is considered one of the principal ancestors of the Book of Mormon and Native American peoples. According to the Book of Mormon, his known immediate family is as shown in the diagram below.

(The Book of Mormon states explicitly that Jacob and Joseph are sons of Lehi, but does not definitely state that they were sons of Sariah.  However, the book also does not mention Lehi having any additional wives.) It is also believed that Lehi had daughters maybe even before Jacob and Joseph were born. Lehi's son, Nephi, mentions having sisters in his writings; their names and birth order are unknown.

Modern commemorations
Lehi, Arizona and Lehi, Utah were named after him by Latter-day Saint settlers.

See also 

 Tree of life vision

Notes

References
.
.

Further reading

John A. Tvedtnes,  “The Influence of Lehi's Admonitions on the Teachings of His Son Jacob,” Journal of Book of Mormon Studies 3/2 (1994): 34-48.
Noel B. Reynolds,  “Lehi as Moses,” Journal of Book of Mormon Studies 9/2 (2000): 26-35.

External links 
 Online Version of the Book of Mormon, published by The Church of Jesus Christ of Latter Day Saints
 1797 map of Pennsylvania in the David Drumsey collection

Book of Mormon prophets